Civil Guard refers to various policing organisations:

Current 
 Civil Guard (Spain), Spanish gendarmerie
 Civil Guard (Israel), Israeli volunteer police reserve
 Civil Guard (Brazil), Municipal law enforcement corporations in Brazil

Historic Civil Guards now abolished:
 Garde Civique of Belgium, a historic militia maintained until 1914
 Civil Guard (Costa Rica), fully merged into the Fuerza Pública
 Civil Guard (Peru), police force of Peru in 1924
 Civil Guard (Colombia), created in 1902 
 Civil Guard (El Salvador), created in 1867, which then gave way to the National Guard in 1912
 Civil Guard (Honduras), a militarized police commanded directly by President Ramón Villeda Morales
 Civil Guard Association for a Better Future, Hungarian anti-Roma organization
 Civil Guard (Panama) (abolished)
 Civil Guard (Philippines), a local gendarmerie organized under the auspices of the Spanish colonial authorities
 Civil Guard (South Vietnam), merged into the South Vietnamese Popular Force and the South Vietnamese Regional Force
 Gwardya Sibil (Philippine resistance network), a civilian underground network operating during World War II
 Suojeluskunta, a Finnish militia for which "Civil Guard" is one of the many English translations
 Civil Guard (Zaire), created in 1984 and disestablished in 1997
 National Civil Guard and the People's Civil Guard, security forces of the Communist Party of Greece between 1944-45 and 1947-49 respectively

See also
 Civic Guard (disambiguation)
 Guard (disambiguation)
 Guardia (disambiguation)
 National Guard
 Home Guard

Types of military forces
Gendarmerie